Saint-Gervais-d'Auvergne (Auvergnat: Sent Gervais d’Auvèrnhe) is a commune in the Puy-de-Dôme department in Auvergne in central France.

See also
Communes of the Puy-de-Dôme department

References

Saintgervaisdauvergne
Auvergne